Emaar Properties (Emaar Developments or simply Emaar) is an Emirati multinational real estate development company located in the United Arab Emirates. It is a public joint-stock company, listed on the Dubai Financial Market, and has a valuation of US$15.5 billion as of June 2021. With six business segments and 60 active companies, Emaar has collective presence in 36 markets across the Middle East, North Africa, Asia, Europe and North America.

Emaar Properties Dubai is one of the largest real estate developers in the UAE and is known for various large-scale projects such as developing Burj Khalifa, the tallest building in the world.

Emaar caused controversy in 2021 and 2022 when their Marassi project on Egypt's Mediterranean coast resulted in extensive beach erosion and significant environmental harm. Widespread outrage on social and traditional media has since been directed at the real estate firm, demanding reimbursement and an explanation. Emaar is said to have deviated from the building permits granted by Egyptian authorities to their project, hence creating unforeseen environmental deterioration of the surrounding beaches. Emaar was seen to ignore those concerns and to carry on with their damaging project activities.

History

1997–2005
Emaar Properties was founded and incorporated in 1997 by chairman Mohamed Alabbar. As one of the leading developers in the UAE, Emaar has diversified interests in real estate including both commercial and residential property development, as well as malls and hospitality. The Dubai government initially owned 100 percent of the company while the founding shareholders held 24.3 percent when operations as a public company commenced after the IPO in 2000. The following year, Emaar announced plans to build Dubai Marina. In 2000, Emaar Properties was listed on the Dubai Financial Market and became the first property company to offer shares to foreign nationals. The first phase of the company's developmental projects began in 2001 when Emaar awarded the contract in a joint venture to build three of the six apartment towers.

In 2003, the company revealed its plans for a signature development project, later known as Downtown Dubai. The project consisted of two developments of historical proportions: Burj Khalifa and The Dubai Mall, the world's tallest building and world's largest mall respectively.

Emaar International LLC was established in 2004 and signified Emaar's expansion into foreign markets. The company has ongoing projects in Africa, Asia, North America, and throughout the Middle East. In 2005, Emaar Hotels & Resorts LLC was established in an exclusive deal with Giorgio Armani to launch a collection of luxury hotels in the designer brand's name. Also in 2005, the high-rise Emaar Square Lifestyle Center was built in Istanbul, Turkey on top of the subterranean Emaar Square Shopping Mall. The 14-story mixed-use building provides residential units, amenity spaces, and retail space at the plaza level.

2006–present
The Dubai Mall officially opened in 2008, and Burj Khalifa in 2010. Despite a collapse in the real estate market in 2009, Emaar reported that Burj Khalifa had reached 80 percent occupancy by fall 2012. By 2014, Emaar was holding over $11.4 billion in real estate investments.

In 2009, John Laing Homes, a subsidiary of Emaar Properties which was acquired in 2006, filed for Chapter 11 bankruptcy protection in the US Court for the District of Delaware.

In July 2010, American businessman Lionel Lombard filed a lawsuit against Emaar Properties and its Chairman Mohamed Alabbar in a California federal court alleging he was wrongfully imprisoned and tortured because he had spoken up on behalf of Emaar foreign workers. The case was dismissed in November 2010 by Lombard.

 
In September 2012, Emaar launched the Address BLVD, a luxurious 72 storey hotel and hotel serviced apartment project in Downtown Burj Dubai adjacent to the Dubai Mall.

In 2014, Emaar Properties announced plans to sell shares of its malls and retail business to the public. The IPO is one of the largest in the region since the global financial crisis. Emaar Malls Group became a publicly traded company on the Dubai Financial Market in October 2014. Closing at 3.25 dirhams with approximately 535 million shares traded, the IPO was the largest in Dubai since 2007. Also in 2014, Emaar opened the world's highest observation deck, At the Top, Burj Khalifa SKY. The highest man-made vantage point sits 555 metres up on the 148th floor of Burj Khalifa.

Emaar celebrated the New Year with the world's most watched NYE celebration for 2015. According to Guinness World Records, Emaar won the title of the "Largest LED-Illuminated Façade" on the world's tallest man made structure" during the NYE celebrations. The record-setting display consisted of 70,000 LED panels that flashed coloured lights and projections of the country's leaders and other images on the Burj Khalifa. Emaar reported a 16 percent rise in second-quarter net profit for 2015, and that it has a land bank of over 235 million square metres.

In March 2015, Emaar launched the Emaar Foundation which supports the United Nations' World Food Programme and organizations such as Dubai Cares and the Dream for Future Africa Foundation. The foundation delivered more than 3,000 meals a day during Ramadan through its Ramadan for All campaign from June to July 2015.

In November 2020, Emaar Properties announced a profit fall of 48% from the beginning of the year until September.

In December 2020, Alabbar steps down as Emaar chairman but will continue to oversee the day-to-day activities as managing director.

The Dubai Mall, developed by Emaar Properties, is the second world's largest shopping mall. It marked its soft opening in November 2008 and was inaugurated in May 2009. The Dubai Mall has over 1,200 stores and 200 restaurants. It is also home to Dubai Aquarium and Underwater Zoo, KidZania, Dubai Ice Rink and the largest cinema complex in the region, Reel Cinemas. In 2014, The Dubai Mall had over 80 million visitors, of which 40 percent were tourists from outside the region. As an extension to Dubai mall, Emaar has begun to develop a 55-storey residential building called Downtown Views.

Another large development project commissioned by Emaar Properties of the Downtown Dubai area is The Dubai Fountain. The Dubai Fountain is the tallest performing fountain in the world that began operating in the spring of 2009. The length of the fountain spreads out to be twice the length of a football field (275 meters).

Emaar also developed the world's tallest building, Burj Khalifa, which opened in 2010. The building is 2,716.5 feet tall with 160 storeys that are primarily for residential purposes. It is named after the Abu Dhabi ruler Sheikh Khalifa bin Zayed Al Nahyan.

Emaar Properties has also developed a collection of neighbourhoods throughout Dubai including Arabian Ranches, Dubai Marina, The Greens, The Meadows, The Lakes, and The Springs. All communities built by Emaar properties are built in a similar architecture and are recognizable at first sight. They follow the modern Arabic architecture including colors. In 2013, Emaar launched several other projects including The Address Residence Fountain Views I, II, and III, The Address Residence Sky View, Burj Vista, Boulevard Point and Vida Residence—all in Downtown Dubai.

A new addition to Downtown Dubai from Emaar is the Opera District. Key features include the Dubai Opera House, the country's first dedicated opera house as well as an array of design studios and other lifestyle amenities.

In other strategic partnerships, Emaar and Meraas Holding is developing Dubai Hills Estate, the first phase of MBR City. The first residential apartment complex in Dubai Hills Estate, Mulberry at Park Heights, has been launched for sale. Emaar Properties launched Dubai Creek Residences, a cluster of six residential towers at Dubai Creek Harbour. The first tower was launched in October 2014, followed by two more towers a month later.

In January 2015, Emaar Hospitality opened a lifestyle boutique hotel, Manzil Downtown Dubai. The hotel is managed by Vida Hotels and Resorts and includes 200 rooms, suites with Burj Khalifa views, and access to a sports hub and several restaurants. Emaar rolled out the region's first hop-on-hop-off transit system with the Dubai Trolley. The trolley is also the world's first hydrogen-powered, zero-emission street tram system.

Emaar Properties announced plans to build the World's tallest structure, which would be taller than Burj Khalifa. It is expected to be completed by 2020.

In 2017, it was announced that Creek Gate, a new residential project in Dubai Creek Harbour would be unveiled and that the hi-rise tower will be located in the Island district. When it is completed, it has been said that it will be almost three times larger than Downtown Dubai and that the development will feature the world's next tallest structure Dubai Creek Tower.

International projects
Through various subsidiaries, Emaar has established property developments and projects in Pakistan, India, Jordan, Egypt, Lebanon, Morocco, the United States, Saudi Arabia, Syria,Iraqi Kurdistan, and Turkey. Emaar Hospitality Group, the hospitality and leisure branch of Emaar, expanded its hotel and residence operations to Nigeria and Bahrain in 2015. Some of the projects have included developments such as the Beit Misk in Lebanon, the Jeddah Gate in Saudi Arabia, and the Samarah Dead Sea Resort in Jordan that was outlined by the King Abdullah II Fund for Development.

Egypt
In 2002, Emaar Misr, an Egyptian subsidiary of Emaar Properties, completed the redevelopment of the Bibliotheca Alexandrina on the eastern harbor of Alexandria. The new library facility stands almost exactly where the ancient Library of Alexandria existed.

Emaar Misr began working on a $4 billion development project in 2005 initially called Cairo Grand Heights that was later renamed Uptown Cairo. The project included building up an area as a residential, commercial, and recreational community.

In 2008, Emaar Misr began working on a tourist resort called Marassi in Sidi Abdel Rahman, located along the Mediterranean coast, that includes a hotel with 3,000 rooms, a marina, and a golf course. In 2018, Emaar Misr announced the re-innovation of a hotel called Al-Alamein Hotel and Resort, located on the Mediterranean coast.

India
Emaar India has a portfolio of projects spanning all key segments of the Indian real estate industry, including residential, commercial, retail (malls) and hospitality. The company has a land bank of some 6,000 acres to be used for future development. Its existing assets and ongoing projects, as also its land banks, are spread across India: Delhi NCR (particularly Gurugram), Mohali, Chennai, Hyderabad, Lucknow, Jaipur and Indore.

Early projects
Emaar entered India in the early 2000s by winning the bid for the Hyderabad International Convention Centre, A joint venture, the Cyberabad Convention Centre Private Limited (CCCPL), was floated specifically for this project, with the other partner being the Andhra Pradesh Industrial Infrastructure Corporation (APIIC). The convention center, which has a total seating capacity of 4,000 seats (extendable to 6,500 seats) was completed in December 2005.

Joint Venture phase
In 2005, while the Hyderabad project was ongoing, Emaar entered into a joint venture to handle future projects in India. Emaar India was founded in 2005 as a joint venture of Emaar Properties PJSC with MGF Developments Limited of India, in which Emaar was by far the larger equity partner and MGF was entrusted the operational responsibilities. The joint venture executed several significant projects, such as the 2010 Commonwealth Games Village in Delhi.

In April 2016, Emaar announced that it would separate from its joint venture partner and that the company would be divided vertically. Shortly after the announcement, Emaar filed the demerger scheme in the Delhi High Court, and Shravan Gupta of MGF resigned from his operational positions. Prashant Gupta is the current CEO of the company.

In pursuance of the intended demerger, the company is presently undergoing a restructuring exercise, wherein Emaar has taken control of all the ongoing projects of the company to ensure their completion at the earliest. The company has committed to deliver 11,000 units by end of 2018, beginning with over 3,000 units in 2017 itself.

Future plans
After initiating the demerger and restructuring exercise, the company launched the "True Emaar lifestyle" brand campaign to focus on establishing the brand 'Emaar India'. In future, the company intends to develop its land bank of 6000 acres, with focus on the residential and hospitality sectors. However, at present its focus is on the completion of all its ongoing projects.

In late 2021, a Memorandum of Understanding was signed between the governments of Dubai and Jammu & Kashmir to facilitate investment into certain marquee projects. Under the agreement, Emaar is to develop a shopping mall in Srinagar of 500,000 sq.ft. EMAAR is also considering other investments in hospitality and mixed use commercial and residential projects in Jammu city and in Srinagar city.

Saudi Arabia
The King Abdullah Economic City (KAEC), developed by Emaar, The Economic City (Emaar E.C.) is listed on Tadawul, the Saudi stock exchange, and is the largest private investment in Saudi Arabia. The project includes the development of a special economic zone along the Red Sea coast 60 miles north of Jeddah. Emaar E.C. also heads the development of the KAEC port. The port is the first privately owned port for Saudi Arabia and was first opened in January 2014, but plans to further expand have been set in place after the generation of new financing. The KAEC development is projected to be about the same size as Washington, D.C. when completed and the zone is estimated to house approximately 2 million people and assist in aiding the Saudi Arabian economy in expanding beyond oil to light and shipping industry.

Syria
Emaar Properties first announced its plans for a large-scale development project in Syria in 2006. The development, known as The Eighth Gate, includes three zones: a commercial center, waterfront and residential zone, and tourist area. The project is a joint venture between Emaar Properties and IGO, an offshore investment and property development company.

Turkey
The Tuscan Valley development was Emaar's first project in Turkey. Emaar completed the first phase of the Tuscan Valley venture by 2007, which included the development of luxury villas and commercial space just outside Istanbul. In 2012, Emaar began developing an Emaar Square project. The project plans include building Turkey's largest shopping mall and five-star hotels. In 2013, Emaar Turkey, the wholly owned subsidiary of Emaar Properties, launched The Address Residences Emaar Square in Istanbul.
In 2017 Emaar Square Mall in Turkey was opened to the public.

Pakistan

The Crescent Bay, Karachi is a very large and important project of Emaar in Pakistan. Crescent Bay is a 108-acre (440,000 m2) under-construction upscale mixed-use oceanfront development in Defence, Karachi, Pakistan. It is considered one of the biggest projects in Pakistan, with a cost of $2.4 billion. The development features a series of high and mid-rise towers for residential and commercial use, a shopping centre, a five-star beachfront hotel and a tower located in the heart of the project.

The Canyon Views is a project of Emaar in Islamabad, Pakistan.

Emaar Pakistan is pioneering the concept of master-planned communities that integrate residential amenities with schools, healthcare, shopping malls, hotels, dining and entertainment, to bring a world-class lifestyle to the country. A subsidiary of Emaar Properties PJSC, the Dubai-based property developer, Emaar Pakistan is fast becoming the property developer of choice for the nation.

Iraqi Kurdistan
Downtown Erbil is a project for a large-scale mixed-use complex in Erbil. The project was launched by Emaar Properties in 2013 and will cover an area of 541,000 square meters. This area will be used for residential apartments, hotels and a shopping mall.

Financial performance
Emaar Properties has posted a net profit of $712m for 2020.
Due to the ongoing pandemic, Emaar Malls Q1 profit dropped by 16% in 2021 as compared to 2020.

References

External links

 Emaar Corporate website

Emirati companies established in 1997
Conglomerate companies established in 1997
Property companies of the United Arab Emirates
Companies based in Dubai
Companies listed on the Dubai Financial Market
Multinational companies headquartered in the United Arab Emirates
Emirati brands